Houba-Brugmann is a Brussels Metro station on line 6. It opened on 5 July 1985 and is located under the /, near Brugmann University Hospital, in Laeken, in the north-west of the City of Brussels, Belgium. It is jointly named after the city official Louis Houba and the 19th-century philanthropist Georges Brugmann.

References

External links

Brussels metro stations
Railway stations opened in 1985
City of Brussels
1985 establishments in Belgium